"Smoke the Weed" is a song by American recording artist Snoop Lion featuring recording artist Collie Buddz. It was released on December 23, 2013 by Berhane Sound System, Vice Records, Mad Decent, and RCA Records. "Smoke the Weed" is the eighth track from his twelfth studio album Reincarnated (2013).

Charts performance

References

2013 singles
2010s ballads
Snoop Dogg songs
Songs written by Snoop Dogg
Reggae fusion songs
RCA Records singles
2013 songs
Songs written by Supa Dups
Songs written by Nellee Hooper
Songs written by Jazzie B
Songs written by Simon Law